Gonçalo is a Portuguese masculine given name and family name.

People with the name include: 
Gonçalo Brandão, a Portuguese footballer
Gonçalo Coelho, a Portuguese explorer of the South Atlantic and of the South American coast
Gonçalo Foro, a Portuguese rugby union footballer
Gonçalo Guedes, a Portuguese footballer
Gonçalo Malheiro, a Portuguese rugby union footballer
Gonçalo Nicau, a Portuguese tennis player
Gonçalo Oliveira, a Portuguese tennis player
Gonçalo Pereira, a Portuguese guitarist
Gonçalo Uva, a Portuguese rugby union player
Gonçalo Velho, a 15th-century Portuguese monk, explorer and settler of the Atlantic
Blessed Gonçalo de Amarante, (1187–1259)

See also
 Gonzalo, the Spanish equivalent
 Gonçalves and Gonsalves, a Portuguese surname meaning "son of Gonçalo"
 São Gonçalo (disambiguation)
 Goncalo alves, a type wood

Portuguese masculine given names